The Medical Act (21 & 22 Vict c 90), An Act to Regulate the Qualifications of Practitioners in Medicine and Surgery, also referred to as the Medical Act 1858, was an Act of the Parliament of the United Kingdom which created the General Medical Council to regulate doctors in the UK.

It is one of the Medical Acts.

Describing its purpose, the Act notes that "it is expedient that Persons requiring Medical Aid should be enabled to distinguish qualified from unqualified Practitioners".

The Act creates the position of Registrar of the General Medical Council — an office still in existence today — whose duty is to keep up-to-date records of those registered to practise medicine and to make them publicly available.

The Act has now been almost entirely repealed. The current law governing medical regulation is the Medical Act 1983.

It stated that under the Poor Law system Boards of Guardians could only employ those qualified in medicine and surgery as Poor Law Doctors.

Under a clause in the Act that recognized doctors with foreign degrees practising in Britain, Elizabeth Blackwell was able to become the first woman to have her name entered on the Medical Register (1 January 1859).

The act also enabled the Royal College of Surgeons of England to be given a new charter allowing them conduct dental examinations.

References

Poor Law in Britain and Ireland
United Kingdom Acts of Parliament 1858
Medical regulation in the United Kingdom